Theatre Calgary is theatre company in Calgary, Alberta, Canada, established as a professional company in 1968. The following is a chronological list of the productions that have been staged since its inception as Musicians and Actors Club (MAC) from 1964 to 1968, and Theatre Calgary from 1968 onwards.

1964–1965
Light Up the Sky – by Moss Hart
A Taste of Honey – by Shelagh Delaney
Two for the Seesaw by William Gibson
Oh Dad, Poor Dad, Mama's Hung You in the Closet and I'm Feelin' So Sad – by Arthur Kopit
The American Dream by Edward Albee
The Sandbox – by Edward Albee
In White America – by Martin Duberman
Luther – by John Osborne

1965–1966
A Thousand Clowns – by Herb Gardner
The Feiffer Revue
Cat On a Hot Tin Roof – by Tennessee Williams
Present Laughter – by Noël Coward
A View from the Bridge – by Arthur Miller
The Private Ear and The Public Eye – by Peter Shaffer
Of Mice and Men – by John Steinbeck
Mary, Mary – by Jean Kerr
The Knack – by Ann Jellicoe
The Hostage – by Brendan Behan

1966–1967
Under the Yum-Yum Tree – by Lawrence Roman
The Firebugs – by Max Frisch
The Caretaker – by Harold Pinter
Major Barbara – by George Bernard Shaw
Breath of Spring – by Peter Coke
The Miracle Worker – by William Gibson
You Can't Take It with You – by George S. Kaufman
A Streetcar Named Desire – by Tennessee Williams

1967–1968
Wild Rose
Luv by Murray Schisgal
The Glass Menagerie – by Tennessee Williams
Charley's Aunt – by Brandon Thomas
Dial M For Murder – by Frederick Knott 
The Killing of Sister George – by Robert Aldrich
Barefoot in the Park – by Neil Simon

1968–1969
The Odd Couple – by Neil Simon
The Alchemist – by Ben Jonson
Gaslight – by Patrick Hamilton
Irma La Douce – music by Marguerite Monnot, lyrics and book by Alexandre Breffort
Private Lives – by Noël Coward
The Three Desks
Black Comedy & The White Liars – by Peter Shaffer

1969–1970
Star Spangled Girl – by Neil Simon
Loot – by Joe Orton
Great Expectations – by Charles Dickens
You Two Stay Here, The Rest of You Come with Me – by Christopher Newton, music by Allen Laing
The Importance of Being Earnest – by Oscar Wilde
Long Day's Journey Into Night – by Eugene O'Neill
Bell, Book and Candle – by John Van Druten

1970–1971
The Entertainer – by John Osborne
The Birthday Party – by Harold Pinter
Dracula – by Hamilton Deane
Trip
The Taming of the Shrew – by William Shakespeare
The Father – by August Strindberg
The Knack – by Ann Jellicoe

1971–1972
Plaza Suite – by Neil Simon
The Rainmaker – by N. Richard Nash
The Guardsman – by Ferenc Molnár
The Hostage – by Brendan Behan
Romeo and Juliet – by William Shakespeare
The House on Chestnut Street – by James W. Nichol
Arms and the Man – by George Bernard Shaw

1972–1973
Butterflies Are Free – by Leonard Gershe
The Effect of Gamma Rays on Man-in-the-Moon Marigolds – by Paul Zindel
Jacques Brel is Alive and Well and Living in Paris – by Jacques Brel
Wait Until Dark – by Frederick Knott
The Devil's Disciple – by George Bernard Shaw
Leaving Home – by David French
Bus Stop – by William Inge

1973–1974
How the Other Half Loves – by Alan Ayckbourn
Walsh – by Sharon Pollock
Oh! What A Lovely War – by Joan Littlewood
Jacques Brel is Alive and Well and Living in Paris – by Jacques Brel
The Fantasticks – music by Harvey Schmidt, lyrics by Tom Jones
Play It Again, Sam – by Woody Allen
The Seagull – by Anton Chekhov
Prisoner of Second Avenue – by Neil Simon

1974–1975
6 RMS Riv VU – by Bob Randall
The Rivals – by Richard Brinsley Sheridan
The Threepenny Opera – by Bertolt Brecht
A Flea in Her Ear – by Georges Feydeau
Who Killed Santa Claus? – by Christian Jaque
Sudden Death Overtime
Relatively Speaking – by Alan Ayckbourn

1975–1976
Tonight at Calgary Theatre Hall
My Fat Friend – by Charles Laurence
Back to Beulah – by W. O. Mitchell
Rosencrantz and Guildenstern Are Dead – by Tom Stoppard
Chemin de Fer – by Georges Feydeau
Absurd Person Singular – by Alan Ayckbourn

1976–1977
The Sunshine Boys – by Neil Simon
The Glass Menagerie – by Tennessee Williams
Time and Time Again – by Alan Acykbourn
Hedda Gabler – by Henrik Ibsen
Festival – book and lyrics by Stephen Downs and Randall Martin, music by Stephen Downs
Equus – by Peter Shaffer
A Thousand Clowns – by Herb Gardner

1977–1978
That Championship Season – by Jason Miller
Sleuth – by Anthony Shaffer
The Condemned of Altona – by Jean-Paul Sartre
The Playboy of the Western World – by J.M. Synge
Streamers – by David Rabe
The Importance of Being Earnest – by Oscar Wilde
Hosanna – by Michel Tremblay
Boiler Room Suite – by Rex Deverell
Travesties – by Tom Stoppard

1978–1979
Same Time, Next Year – by Bernard Slade
The Mary Shelley Play
Mandragola – by Niccolò Machiavelli
One Night Stand – by Carol Bolt
Under Milk Wood – by Dylan Thomas
The Black Bonspiel of Wullie MacCrimmon – by W. O. Mitchell
Midtown Acres
Antigone – by Jean Anouilh
Paper Wheat – by 25th Street House Theatre 
The Miners Forty Niners

1979–1980
Eight to the Bar
Of Mice and Men – by John Steinbeck
Thark – by Ben Travers
The Words of My Roaring – by Robert Kroetsch
Mirandolina – by Bohuslav Martinů
Birds – by Aristophanes
Black Bonspiel of Wullie MacCrimmon – by W.O. Mitchell
Sexual Perversity in Chicago – by David Mamet
White Whore and the Bit Player – by Tom Eyen
Rainbow
Rock and more
Blitzkrieg
Perfect Relationships
Out at Sea – by Nicholas Bethell, Slawomir Mrozek
The Man With the Flower in His Mouth – by Luigi Pirandello
Spider Rabbit – by Michael McClure

1980–1981
Jitters – by David French
Betrayal – by Harold Pinter
Automatic Pilot – by Erika Ritter
The Tempest – by William Shakespeare
Happy End – lyrics by Bertolt Brecht, music by Kurt Weill
The Kite – by W.O. Mitchell
Maggie and Pierre – by Linda Griffiths
Solange / The Beard
Joggers – by Geraldine Aron
Unseen
Years of Sorrow, Years of Shame
Yanks 3 / Detroit 0, Top of the Seventh – by Johnathan Reynolds

1981–1982
Mrs. Warren's Profession – by George Bernard Shaw
Blood Relations – by Sharon Pollock
The Sea Horse – by Edward J. Moore
For Those in Peril at Sea – W.O. Mitchell
Farther West – by John Murrell
On Golden Pond – by Ernest Thompson
The Elephant Man – by Bernard Pomerance
Cold Comfort – by Jim Garrard
President Wilson in Paris – by Ron Blair
The Immigrant – by Mark Harelik, Sarah Knapp, Steven M. Alper
Bullshot Crummond – by Ronald E. House, Diz White, Alan Shearman

1982–1983
Mass Appeal – by Bill C. Davis
A Moon for the Misbegotten – by Eugene O'Neill
Rexy! – by Allan Stratton
Whiskey Six Rebellion – by Sharon Pollock
Let's Get a Divorce – based on Divorcons by Victorien Sardou and Émile de Najac
Talley's Folly – by Lanford Wilson
Emlyn Williams as Charles Dickens – by Emlyn Williams

1983–1984
What the Butler Saw – by Joe Orton
A Christmas Carol – by Charles Dickens
Old Times – by Harold Pinter
I'm Getting My Act Together and Taking It on the Road
Doc – by Sharon Pollock
The Dining Room – by A.R. Gurney Jr.

1984–1985
A Streetcar Named Desire – by Tennessee Williams
A Christmas Carol – by Charles Dickens
Cold Storage – by Ronald Ribman
Whodunnit – Anthony Shaffer
Quartermaine's Terms – by Simon Gray
Filthy Rich – by George F. Walker
Cloud 9 – by Caryl Churchill
Forever Yours, Marie-Lou – by Michel Tremblay

1985–1986
Twelfth Night – by William Shakespeare
K2 – by Patrick Meyers
Alice on Stage
Uncle Vanya – by Anton Chekhov
Criminals in Love – by George F. Walker
Country Hearts – by Ted Johns and John Roby
Intimate Admiration – by Rick Epp

1986–1987
Brighton Beach Memoirs – by Neil Simon
The Play's the Thing – by Ferenc Molnár
Salt-Water Moon – by David French
And When I Wake - by James W. Nichol
Golden Girls
The Normal Heart – by Larry Kramer
Souvenirs
True West – by Sam Shepard

1987–1988
Pal Joey – music by Richard Rodgers, lyrics by Lorenz Hart, book by John O’Hara
Summer – by Jane Martin
Walsh – by Sharon Pollock
You Never Can Tell – by George Bernard Shaw
Making Brownies Like We Used To – by John Palmer
The Real Thing – by Tom Stoppard
Beauty and the Beast – by Warren Graves

1988–1989
Broadway Bound – by Neil Simon
Terra Nova – by Ted Talley
The Black Bonspiel of Wullie MacCrimmon – by W. O. Mitchell
The Glass Menagerie – by Tennessee Williams
The Innocents – by William Archibald
Fire – by Paul Ledoux and David Young

1989–1990
Blithe Spirit – by Noël Coward
Toronto, Mississippi – by Joan MacLeod
A Christmas Carol – by Charles Dickens
Driving Miss Daisy – by Alfred Uhry
Bordertown Cafe – by Kelly Rebar
Summer and Smoke – by Tennessee Williams

1990–1991
Tartuffe – by Molière
Amigo's Blue Guitar – by Joan MacLeod
A Christmas Carol – by Charles Dickens
Letters from Wingfield Farm – by Dan Needles
My Children, My Africa – by Athol Fugard
The Woman in Black – by Susan Hill
Amadeus – by Peter Shaffer

1991–1992
A Midsummer Night's Dream – by William Shakespeare
The Sum of Us – by David Stevens
Wingfield's Progress – by Dan Needles
A Christmas Carol – by Charles Dickens
Les Liaisons Dangereuses – by Christopher Hampton
The Motor Trade
Fences – by August Wilson
Gypsy – music by Jule Styne, lyrics by Stephen Sondheim, book by Arthur Laurents

1992–1993
Much Ado About Nothing – by William Shakespeare
The Kite – by W.O. Mitchell
A Christmas Carol – by Charles Dickens
La Bête – by David Hirson
Arsenic and Old Lace – by Joseph Kesselring
Wingfield's Folly – by Dan Needles
Evita – music by Andrew Lloyd Webber, lyrics by Tim Rice

1993–1994
Dancing at Lughnasa – by Brian Friel
Tru – by Jay Presson Allen
A Christmas Carol – by Charles Dickens
Henceforward... – by Alan Ayckbourn
Hamlet – by William Shakespeare
Wrong for Each Other – by Norm Foster
Anne of Green Gables – by Lucy Maud Montgomery

1994–1995
Forever Plaid – by Stuart Ross
Charley's Aunt – by Brandon Thomas
A Christmas Carol – by Charles Dickens
Transit of Venus – by Maureen Hunter
Waiting for Godot – by Samuel Beckett
If We Are Women – by Joanna McClelland Glass
Into the Woods – music and lyrics by Stephen Sondheim, book by James Lapine, based on The Uses of Enchantment by Bruno Bettelheim
Forever Plaid – by Stuart Ross

1995–1996
Waiting for the Parade – by John Murrell
The Importance of Being Earnest – by Oscar Wilde
A Christmas Carol – by Charles Dickens
Cyrano de Bergerac – by Edmond Rostand
Atlantis – by Maureen Hunter
Dr. Jekyll and Mr. Hyde: A Love Story – by James W. Nichol
Little Shop of Horrors – by Howard Ashman and Alan Menken

1996–1997
Tons of Money – by Alan Ayckbourn
A Christmas Carol – by Charles Dickens
Stephen and Mister Wilde  – by Jim Bartley
Piaf  – by Pam Gems
The Heiress – by Ruth Goetz and Augustus Goetz

1997–1998
The Cocktail Hour – by A. R. Gurney
An Inspector Calls – by J.B. Priestley
A Christmas Carol – by Charles Dickens
A Delicate Balance – by Edward Albee
Memoir
Song and Dance  – music by Andrew Lloyd Webber, lyrics by Don Black, additional lyrics by Richard Maltby, Jr.

1998–1999
Private Lives – by Noël Coward
All My Sons – by Arthur Miller
A Christmas Carol – by Charles Dickens
The Fox – by Allan Miller
Candida – by George Bernard Shaw
The Fantasticks – music by Harvey Schmidt, lyrics by Tom Jones

1999–2000
Wingfield Unbound – by Dan Needles
The Glass Menagerie – by Tennessee Williams
A Christmas Carol – by Charles Dickens
Gaslight by Patrick Hamilton
A Fitting Confusion – by Georges Feydeau
Holiday – by Philip Barry
Berlin to Broadway with Kurt Weill music by Kurt Weill, Lyrics by Alan Jay Lerner, Bertolt Brecht, Ira Gershwin, Michael Feingold, Ogden Nash, Maxwell Anderson, Marc Blitzstein, Jacques Deval, Paul Green, Langston Hughes, George Tabori, Arnold Weinstein

2000–2001
Rough Crossing
Cat on a Hot Tin Roof – by Tennessee Williams
A Christmas Carol – by Charles Dickens
Camelot – by Alan Lerner and Frederick Loewe
Dangerous Corner – by J.B. Priestley
The Sisters Rosensweig – by Wendy Wasserstein

2001–2002
Cabaret – book by Joe Masteroff, lyrics by Fred Ebb, music by John Kander
Romeo and Juliet – by William Shakespeare
A Christmas Carol – by Charles Dickens
True West – by Sam Shepard
Death of a Salesman – by Arthur Miller
Wingfield on Ice – by Dan Needles

2002–2003
A Streetcar Named Desire – by Tennessee Williams
Dracula – by Hamilton Deane
A Christmas Carol – by Charles Dickens
Evita – music by Andrew Lloyd Webber, lyrics by Tim Rice
The Philadelphia Story – by Phillip Barry
Copenhagen – by Michael Frayn

2003–2004
Hay Fever – by Noël Coward
The Diary of Anne Frank – by Frances Goodrich and Albert Hackett
A Christmas Carol – by Charles Dickens
Fire – by Paul Ledoux and David Young
Crimes of the Heart – by Beth Henley
Counsellor-At-Law – by Elmer Rice

2004–2005
Of the Fields, Lately – by David French
Sherlock Holmes – by Arthur Conan Doyle
A Christmas Carol – by Charles Dickens
Macbeth – by William Shakespeare
West Side Story – book by Arthur Laurents, music by Leonard Bernstein, lyrics by Stephen Sondheim
Humble Boy – by Charlotte Jones

2005–2006
The Miracle Worker – by William Gibson
Wingfield's Inferno – by Dan Needles
A Christmas Carol – by Charles Dickens
Saint Joan – by George Bernard Shaw
Trying – by Joanna Glass
Guys and Dolls – music and lyrics by Frank Loesser, book by Jo Swerling and Abe Burrows

2006–2007
Of Mice and Men – by John Steinbeck
Glorious! – by Peter Quilter
A Christmas Carol – by Charles Dickens
The Retreat from Moscow – by William Nicholson
The Cripple of Inishmaan – by Martin McDonagh
The Overcoat – by Morris Panych and Wendy Gorling

2007–2008
The Wars – by Timothy Findley
Vigil – by Morris Panych
A Christmas Carol – by Charles Dickens
Our Town – by Thornton Wilder
Enchanted April – by Matthew Barber
Beauty and the Beast – music by Alan Menken, lyrics by Howard Ashman and Tim Rice, book by Linda Woolverton

2008–2009
A Raisin in the Sun – by Lorraine Hansberry
Skydive – by Kevin Kerr
A Christmas Carol – by Charles Dickens, adapted by Jerry Patch
Frankenstein – written, composed and directed by Jonathan Christenson, adapted from the novel by Mary Shelley
Doubt: A Parable – by John Patrick Shanley
An Ideal Husband – by Oscar Wilde
Dirty Rotten Scoundrels – book by Jeffrey Lane, music & lyrics by David Yazbek

2009–2010
Jake and the Kid – adapted by Conni Massing, based on the short stories by W.O. Mitchell
7 Stories – by Morris Panych
A Christmas Carol – by Charles Dickens
  Electric Company Theatre and The Virtual Stage's production of No Exit
Beyond Eden – by Bruce Ruddell, music by Bruce Ruddell and Bill Henderson
Betrayal – by Harold Pinter
The 25th Annual Putnam County Spelling Bee – music and lyrics by William Finn, book by Rachel Sheinkin

2010–2011
One Flew Over the Cuckoo's Nest – by Dale Wasserman
Lost - A Memoir – by Cathy Ostlere and Dennis Garnhum
A Christmas Carol – by Charles Dickens, adapted by Jeremy Patch
Billy Bishop Goes to War – by John MacLachlan Gray and Eric Peterson
The Drowsy Chaperone – by Lisa Lambert and Greg Morrison
Much Ado About Nothing  – by William Shakespeare
Mom's the Word For Crying Out Loud – by Jill Daum, Linda A. Carson, Alison Kelly, Barbara Pollard, Robin Nichols and Deborah Williams

2011–2012
Tosca Cafe – by Carey Perloff and Val Caniparoli
To Kill a Mockingbird  – adapted by Christopher Sergel, based on the novel by Harper Lee
A Christmas Carol – by Charles Dickens, adapted by Dennis Garnhum
Ubuntu: The Cape Town Project– by Theatrefront
Enron – by Lucy Prebble
Shirley Valentine – by Willy Russell
Cats (musical) – by Andrew Lloyd Webber

2012–2013
Next to Normal – by Brian Yorkey and Tom Kitt
Pride and Prejudice – by Jane Austen
A Christmas Carol – by Charles Dickens, adapted by Dennis Garnhum
The Kite Runner  – by Khaled Hosseini, adapted by Matthew Spangler
God of Carnage –  by Yasmina Reza, translated by Christoper Hampton
 Anne of Green Gables – The Musical – by Lucy Maud Montgomery, Music and Lyrics by Donald Harron, Norman Campbell, Elaine Campbell and Mavor Moore

2013-2014 
 Romeo and Juliet – by William Shakespeare
 Kim's Convienience – by Ins Choi
 The Great Gatsby  – adapted by Simon Levy, based on the novel by F. Scott Fitzgerald
 A Christmas Carol – by Charles Dickens adapted by Dennis Garnhum
 Boom – written and performed by Rick Miller
 Major Barbara – by George Bernard Shaw
 The Mountaintop – by Katori Hall
 Disney's and Cameron Mackintosh's Mary Poppins – music and lyrics by Robert B. Sherman, Richard M. Sherman and George Stiles, book by Julian Fellowes, based on the book series by P.L. Travers

2014-2015 
 The Comedy of Errors – by William Shakespeare
 One Man, Two Guvnors  – by Richard Bean
 Liberation Days  – by David van Belle
 A Christmas Carol – by Charles Dickens adapted by Dennis Garnhum
 Chelsea Hotel – conceived by Tracey Power
 The Philadelphia Story – by Philip Barry
 King Lear – by William Shakespeare
 Dear Johnny Deere – by Ken Cameron

2015-2016 
 The Tempest – by William Shakespeare
 The Shoplifters – by Morris Panych, Canadian premiere
 The Crucible  – by Arthur Miller
 A Christmas Carol  – by Charles Dickens, adapted by Dennis Garnhum
 Spin – written and performed by evalyn parry
 The Little Prince - The Musical  – based on the book by Antoine de Saint-Exupéry, adapted by Nicholas Lloyd Webber and James D. Reid, a world premiere production with Lamplighter Drama, London, UK.
 Bad Jews  – by Joshua Harmon
 The Light in the Piazza  – book by Craig Lucas, music and lyrics by Adam Guettel, based on the novel by Elizabeth Spencer, produced by arrangement with Turner Entertainment Co., owner of the original motion picture Light in the Piazza. The Light in the Piazza was presented through special arrangement with R&H Theatricals

2016-2017 
 Hamlet  – by William Shakespeare
 'Da Kink in My Hair – by Trey Anthony
 Boom – written and performed by Rick Miller
 A Christmas Carol – by Charles Dickens, adapted by Dennis Garnhum
 Songs of Resilience – by the Queer Songbook Orchestra and Special Guests
 The Audience  – by Peter Morgan
 Skylight – by David Hare
 A Thousand Splendid Suns – based on the novel by Khaled Hosseini, adapted by Ursula Rani Sarma, original music written and performed by David Coulter, a world premiere production with American Conservatory Theater (A.C.T.), San Francisco
 Crazy for You - The New Gershwin Musical – music and lyrics by George Gershwin and Ira Gershwin, book by Ken Ludwig, A co-production with The Citadel Theatre, Edmonton

2017-2018 
Blow Wind High Water - by Sharon Pollock
Sisters: The Belles Soeurs Musical - based on the play by Michel Tremblay, book and lyrics by René Richard Cyr, music by Daniel Belanger
Twelfth Night - by William Shakespeare
The Humans - by Stephen Karam
The Secret Garden - book and lyrics by Marsha Norman, music by Lucy Simon
As You Like It - by William Shakespeare
A Christmas Carol - by Charles Dickens, adapted by Dennis Garnhum
Onegin - by Amiel Gladstone and Veda Hille

External links 
Official site
Canadian theatre company production histories
Theatre in Calgary
Theatre companies in Alberta